Justin Fleming (born 3 January 1953) is an Australian playwright and author. He has written for theatre, music theatre, opera, television and cinema and his works have been produced and published in Australia, the US, Canada, the UK, Belgium, Poland and France. Fleming has been a barrister and vice president of the Australian Writers' Guild and a board member of the Australian National Playwrights' Centre.

Early life, education and career

Born in Sydney in 1953, Fleming is one of the six children of Drs Justin Fleming and Gwen Fleming of Sydney, Australia. His father Justin Fleming Snr, was a pioneer vascular surgeon who served with the RAAF during World War Two. Mother Gwen Fleming (née Lusby), also a doctor, had served as one of the first women majors in the Australian Army Medical Corps during the War. The couple met while serving at Concord Military Hospital, and married soon after the war, going on to have six children - Margaret, Paul, Justin, Judith, James and Peter. 

Fleming attended high school at Saint Ignatius' College, Riverview, a Jesuit college in Sydney. Here he was taught english literature by Joseph Castley and Charles MacDonald, S.J., and the classics by Charles Fraser, S.J. Near contemporaries at the college included writers Gerard Windsor and Nick Enright and composer Stewart D'Arrietta. He was taught music by Lorraine Henderson, Julienne Horn and Tessa Birnie. After graduating High School, Fleming enrolled in Arts at the University of New South Wales, and attended part time acting classes with Hayes Gordon and Zika Nester at the Ensemble Theatre in Sydney. In 1972, he joined Gemini Productions working in television and contributed scripts for The Godfathers, The True Blue Show (ATN 7), The Spoiler and The Young Doctors. 

In 1973, Fleming commenced part time studies in law at the University of Sydney, where he became director of the Gilbert and Sullivan Society, with productions including Trial by Jury and Cox and Box. He worked as a Judge's Associate from 1975, and completed his first law degree in 1978. He subsequently gained a Master of Laws with Merit from University College London. He was associate to District Court Judge John Lincoln from 1974 until 1979 and for some years worked a barrister in Dublin and Sydney, before devoting himself full-time to writing. Fleming wrote his first plays in the late 1970s, while still working in the law. He completed the manuscript for Hammer in 1978 and Doubted his Empire in 1979.  

Fleming is married to author and academic, Fae Brauer.

Career as playwright

Fleming's first play, Hammer, was staged at the Festival of Sydney in 1981 and was followed by Indian Summer in 1982. In 1983, in the Sydney Opera House, Sir Robert Helpmann starred for the Sydney Theatre Company in the world premiere of Fleming's play The Cobra. Helpmann portrayed the elderly Lord Alfred Douglas, reflecting bitterly on his notorious youthful relationship with Oscar Wilde.

In 1989, the Sydney Theatre Company produced Harold in Italy at the Sydney Opera House; it was later staged by the Teatr Studyjny in Lodz Poland. The Deep Blue was staged at The Bush, London, in 1991 and the following year the Ensemble Rep Studios produced The Nonsense Boy. Fleming has twice been awarded the Nancy Keesing Writer's Fellowship to the Cité internationale des arts in Paris (1993, 1998), where he wrote The Starry Messenger  and Burnt Piano (in French Le piano brulé). The latter was staged around Australia and went on to win the New York New Dramatists' Award in the year 2000 and opened in New York City in March 2001. It was short-listed for various awards including the NSW Premier's Literary Awards and won the Banff PlayRites Residency, Canada. The playwright Harold Pinter was an admirer of Fleming's work, particularly the portrait of Samuel Beckett in Burnt Piano. Pinter described Fleming as a writer "of authority and distinction".

Other plays include adaptations of Émile Zola's Au Bonheur des Dames (The Department Store) at Old Fitzroy and D. H. Lawrence's Kangaroo at the Illawarra Performing Arts Centre, 27 August 2003.

Fleming has been librettist and lyricist on Crystal Balls (Compact Opera/UK tour/Sadler's Wells, London), The Ninth Wonder (Sydney Theatre Company), Tess of the d'Urbervilles (Savoy Theatre, London and UK tour), Accidental Miracles (WAAPA/Sydney Theatre Company/Cameron Macintosh), Satango (Griffin Theatre Company/Riverside Theatres/Vegas Theater Company), Ripper (Ensemble Theatre), Laid in Earth (Queensland Music Festival), The Merry Widow for Opera Australia, West Australian Opera, Opera Queensland, State Opera of South Australia, and Whiteley for Opera Australia. Whiteley was nominated by the Writers' Guild for an AWGIE award for Music Theatre 2020 and an International Opera Award for Best New Work 2020. Fleming is creator and librettist on a new opera, Zelenskyy on Volodymyr Zelenskyy, President of Ukraine, and his wife, Olena Zelenska.

In 2006, Fleming was made Writer-in-Residence by the Dr Robert and Lina Thyll-Dur Foundation at La Casa Zia Lina, Elba in Italy, where he translated Molière's Tartuffe (titled as The Hypocrite) from the original French into English. In 2007 he was awarded the Writer's Residency at Arthur Boyd's Bundanon, where he wrote Origin, a play on the subject of Charles Darwin, commissioned by the Melbourne Theatre Company. He was granted a residency at the Don Bank Museum, North Sydney and awarded the Tasmanian Writers' Centre Residency in 2008, where he wrote His Mother's Voice. In 2011, Fleming was commissioned by the Bell Shakespeare Company to translate Molière's The School for Wives and by Ensemble Studio Theatre and Alfred P. Sloan Foundation, New York, to write Soldier of the Mind, a play about Santiago Ramón y Cajal, the Spanish neuroscientist.

In 2015, Riverside Theatres produced Shellshock and in 2016 Griffin Theatre Company and Bell Shakespeare Company co-produced The Literati, Fleming's adaptation of Molière's Les Femmes Savantes. 2018 saw Dresden at KXT in Sydney, and The Misanthrope in Bell Shakespeare Company's co-production with Griffin Theatre Company; and in 2019, Bell Shakespeare Company toured his translation of The Miser. The Scream was shortlisted for the Silver Gull Play Award 2020. A new play, Doris Fitton was shortlisted for the Seaborne Broughton & Walford Foundation Playwrights Award 2021.

Fleming has been vice president of the Australian Writers' Guild and served on the board of the Australian National Playwrights' Centre. His plays have been produced and published widely, including the UK, US, Canada, France, Australia, Belgium and Poland.

Other works

Among his works for television, Fleming wrote Part One of the history of Australian cinema, The Celluloid Heroes for ABC TV. Fleming's history of the Common Law, Barbarism to Verdict, was written for ABC/BBC television, and published internationally by HarperCollins with a foreword by John Mortimer QC. Other publications include Fleming's histories: The Crest of the Wave (Allen & Unwin), The Vision Splendid and All that Brothers Should Be (Beaver Press). His Paris journal was published by Halstead Press in Paris Studio. He is the author of Stage Lines – Writing Scripts for the Theatre (Phoenix Education) and A Molière Anthology (Five Senses Education).

Published works

Nonfiction
 All That Brothers Should Be
 Paris Studio
 Barbarism to Verdict – A History of the Common Law, foreword by John Mortimer, QC  (pbk.)
 The Vision Splendid – A History of Carroll & O'Dea
 The Crest of the Wave – A history of Waverley College 1903–2003
 The Wave Rolls On – Waverley College Old Boys' Union 1908–2008– format edited by Col Blake
 A Molière Anthology – Tartuffe, The School for Wives, The Miser, The Literati (Les Femnes Savantes). Published by Phoenix Education; Currency Press.
 His Mother's Voice. Phoenix Education.
 Stagelines – Writing Scripts for the Theatre. Phoenix Education.
Opera and music theatre librettos/lyrics
Crystal Balls
The Ninth Wonder
Tess of the d'Urbervilles
 The Merry Widow – Opera Australia
 Accidental Miracles
 Satango
 Ripper
 Laid in Earth
 Whiteley (2019, music: Elena Kats-Chernin, life of Brett Whiteley)
Scripts
 The Nonsense Boy
 Junction
 The Cobra
 Burnt Piano – published by Phoenix Education
 Hammer
 Kangaroo
 Coup d'etat & Other Plays
 Indian Summer
 The Department Store
 Laid in Earth, (Queensland Music Festival 2009 – music by Damian Barbeler)
 Satango
 Harold in Italy
 The Myth of the Passive Citizen
 The Starry Messenger
 The Cobra
 Her Holiness – with Melvyn Morrow
 Tartuffe (The Hypocrite)
 The School for Wives
 His Mother's Voice
 A Molière Anthology
 Stagelines: Writing Scripts for the Theatre
Screenplays
Lord Devil
The Shedding
The Tree House
Caroline
Dead Men Running
Nellie

See also

Gwen Fleming
Jack Lusby
Rosemary Follett
List of playwrights
Theatre of Australia

References

External links
Fleming's papers at the State Library of New South Wales
Fleming in the Catalogue of the National Library of Australia 
 Justin Fleming play bundle on AustralianPlays
, a history of Sydney lawyers Carroll and O'Dea
 
 Fleming, Justin (1953–) at NLA Trove

1953 births
Australian dramatists and playwrights
Australian opera librettists
Operetta librettists
Living people
University of Sydney alumni
Alumni of University College London
People educated at Saint Ignatius' College, Riverview